Wijekoon Mudiyanselage Manjula Wijekoon Dissanayake (born 27 January 1967) is a Sri Lankan politician, former provincial councillor and Member of Parliament.

Dissanayake was born on 27 January 1967. She is the widow of former government minister Salinda Dissanayake. She served as her husband's private secretary. She was a member of the North Western Provincial Council. Following the 2020 parliamentary election she was appointed to the Parliament of Sri Lanka as a National List MP representing the Sri Lanka People's Freedom Alliance.

References

1967 births
Living people
Members of the 16th Parliament of Sri Lanka
Members of the North Western Provincial Council
Sinhalese politicians
Sri Lankan Buddhists
Sri Lanka People's Freedom Alliance politicians
Sri Lanka Podujana Peramuna politicians
United People's Freedom Alliance politicians
Women legislators in Sri Lanka